Aylesbury TMD is a traction maintenance depot located in Aylesbury, Buckinghamshire, England. The depot is situated on the London to Aylesbury Line and is to the west of Aylesbury station.

History 
Up until 2017, the depot had an allocation of Class 121 Bubble Cars until these were withdrawn from regular passenger service.

Allocation 
From 2020, the depot's allocation includes
Class 165 Networkers and Class 168 Clubmans.

References 

 Railway depots in England
 Rail transport in Buckinghamshire